Mount Laojun (also called Jingshi Mountain 景室山) is a mountain in Henan Province, China. 

Along with the Jiguan Cave, the mountain forms part of a tourist scenic area that is rated as AAAAA, the highest category in the tourist rating system. Historically, the mountain was a retreat for Laozi, the founder of Taoism.

See also
List of mountains in China

References

External links
Official website

Laojun
AAAAA-rated tourist attractions